Portal de las Américas is a terminus station of the TransMilenio mass-transit system of Bogotá, Colombia, which opened in the year 2000.

Location
Portal de las Américas is located in southwestern Bogotá, specifically on Avenida Ciudad de Cali with Avenida Ciudad de Villavicencio. It is also known for its many ghost sightings

History
In December 2003, this station was opened before work was even finished on the line running along the Avenida Ciudad de Cali. It was the fifth terminus of the system to be opened.

At first, only red buses of the size of the feeder buses were used at this station. They bore signs reading P.A. or PORTAL AMÉRICAS but did not have a formal route number. In May 2004, after the Biblioteca Tintal and Patio Bonito stations were opened, the station began normal operations on one of its three platforms.

Station services

Old trunk services

Main line service

Feeder routes
The following feeder routes serve this station:
 Casablanca loop
 Metrovivienda loop
 Bosa La Libertad loop
 Patio Bonito loop
 Avenida Tintal loop
 Avenida Villavicencio loop
 Bosa la Independencia loop
 Porvenir loop
 Bosa-Santafé loop
 Roma loop
 Franja Seca loop

Inter-city service
Despite having three platforms, the Portal de las Américas does not have inter-city buses because it is located in a populous area in the southwest of the city, far from any routes leaving town.

See also
List of TransMilenio Stations

External links
TransMilenio

TransMilenio